Aaron Smith is an American poet. Three of his poetry collections have been finalists for the Lambda Literary Award for Gay Poetry. His poetry often covers "what it means to be a gay man from a rural, working class environment."

Education and career 
Smith received a Master of Fine Arts from the University of Pittsburgh. He previously taught at West Virginia Wesleyan College and currently serves as an associate professor of Creative Writing at Lesley University. He has also been the recipient of fellowships from the New York Foundation for the Arts and the Mass Cultural Council.

Publications

Poetry collections 

 Blue on Blue Ground, Agnes Lynch Starrett Poetry Prize (University of Pittsburgh Press, 2005)
 Appetite (University of Pittsburgh Press, 2012)
 Primer (University of Pittsburgh Press, 2016)
 The Book of Daniel (University of Pittsburgh Press, 2019)
 Stop Lying (University of  Pittsburgh Press, 2023)

Chapbooks 

 Men in Groups: Chapbook (Winged City/New Sins Press 2011)
 What's Required

Poems 

 “What It Feels Like to be Aaron Smith,” in The Best American Poetry 2013 (Scribner, 2013)

Awards

References

External links 

 Official website

Living people
Lesley University faculty
University of Pittsburgh alumni
Year of birth missing (living people)
21st-century American poets
American LGBT poets